The Lithuanian National Olympic Committee (LTOK) is the National Olympic Committee representing Lithuania.

History 
Lithuania's national Olympic committee was established and recognized in 1924. In the same year LTOK sent its first delegation to the 1924 Summer Olympics. During Soviet Union occupation time LTOK was disestablished. At 1988 movement for freedom times there was offered to restore national committee. On October 10, 1988 LSSR physical education and sport organization created a special group to reestablish National Olympic Committee of Lithuania. Group chairman become . At same year December 11 in Vilnius was held delegates session in which LTOK was restored, and Artūras Poviliūnas was elected its president. LTOK delegates on February 15, 1990, in Lausanne met IOC spokesman. Following the Act of the Re-Establishment of the State of Lithuania on March 11, the republic withdrew its athletes from all Soviet national competitions. Lithuania attempted to first compete on its own at the 1990 Goodwill Games that would be contested from July to August, but the request was rejected and an attempt to make the athletes carry the republic's flag during welcoming ceremonies and wear patches on their Soviet uniforms bearing the Lithuanian insignia was not accepted by the LTOK. Only four Lithuanian athletes accepted to play for the USSR at the Goodwill Games.

In a 1991 IOC meeting at Berlin, the National Olympic Committee of Lithuania was officially recognized. Lithuania was along with Baltic neighbors Latvia and Estonia one of the first parts of the former USSR to participate as an independent country.

Participating incidents 
 In the 1932 Summer Olympics in Los Angeles, Lithuania did not participate due to economic difficulties and political controversies surrounding the National Olympic Committee.
 In the 1936 Summer Olympics in Berlin, Lithuania was not invited by Nazi Germany due to the Klaipėda/Memelland region controversy.
 On 19 November 2021, a group of 17 members of Lithuanian national parliament Seimas released an official letter encouraging Lithuania to withdraw from the 2022 Winter Olympics due to human rights violations in China. Daina Gudzinevičiūtė, president of National Olympic Committee of Lithuania, released a statement that Olympic games should be politically neutral and confirmed that committee has no plans to boycott the games. On 3 December 2021, Lithuania was the first nation to announce a diplomatic boycott of the games.

Current NOC Leadership

President 

Artūras Poviliūnas (1988–2012)
Daina Gudzinevičiūtė (2012–present)

Vice presidents 
 Arvydas Juozaitis
 Algis Vasiliauskas
 Romualdas Bakutis

Secretary General 
Valentinas Paketūras

Members 
LTOK has 40 full time members, 3 approved observers and 12 Olympic-friendly unions:

Full time members (40)

Approved observers (3)

 Olympic-friendly unions (12)

Olympic sport federations not part of LTOK: Lithuanian Bobsleigh and Skeleton Federation, Lithuanian Luge Federation, Lithuanian Softball Federation

See also
 Lithuania at the Olympics

References

External links
 

Lithuania
Lithuania at the Olympics
Sports governing bodies in Lithuania
Organizations based in Vilnius
1924 establishments in Lithuania